Magus is the fifth studio album by American sludge metal band Thou. It was released on August 31, 2018 through Sacred Bones Records.

Accolades

Track listing

Charts

References

2018 albums
Thou (American band) albums
Sacred Bones Records albums